Kinabalujapyx is a genus of diplurans in the family Japygidae.

Species
 Kinabalujapyx disturbator Pagés, 1994

References

Diplura